Flying from Justice  is a 1915 British silent crime film directed by Percy Nash and starring Gregory Scott, Douglas Payne and Joan Ritz.

Cast
 Gregory Scott as Charles Baring  
 Joan Ritz as Winnie  
 Douglas Payne as John Gully  
 Alice Moseley as Mildred Parkes  
 Fred Morgan as James Woodruffe  
 Cecil Morton York as Rev. Lacarsey 
 Frank Tennant as John Lacarsey  
 Jack Denton as Pearly Tanner  
 Maud Williams as Mrs. Baring  
 Brian Daly as Maj. Parkes

References

Bibliography
 Palmer, Scott. British Film Actors' Credits, 1895-1987. McFarland, 1988.

External links

1915 films
1915 crime films
British crime films
British silent feature films
Films directed by Percy Nash
British black-and-white films
1910s English-language films
1910s British films